is a Japanese television jidaigeki or period drama that was broadcast in 1975. It is the 5th in the Hissatsu series.

Cast
Ken Ogata : Shiranu Kaono Hanbei
Ryūzō Hayashi : Masakichi 
Nobuto Okamoto : Risuke
Mie Nakao : Oharu (Hanbei's wife) 
Mitsuko Kusabue : Osei She returns in Edo Professional Hissatsu Shōbainin (1978).

See also
 Hissatsu Shikakenin (First in the Hissatsu series) 
 Hissatsu Shiokinin  (2nd in the Hissatsu series) 
 Shin Hissatsu Shiokinin (10th in the Hissatsu series)

References

1975 Japanese television series debuts
1970s drama television series
Jidaigeki television series